Josip Elez (born 25 April 1994) is a Croatian professional footballer who plays as a defender for Hajduk Split.

Career
Elez started his career at NK Solin, his hometown club. At the age of 14 he moved to HNK Hajduk Split, where he spent five years as a youngster and also collected three first team caps in the Croatian First Football League.

In July 2013, age 19, Elez was transferred to S.S. Lazio for a fee €400,000. Elez spent the 2014–15 season on loan at Grosseto and Honvéd in Hungary, where he was a regular starter. He spent the following season on loan at Aarhus Gymnastikforening in Denmark, where he made 29 appearances and scored two goals. AGF were interested in keeping him at the club but were unable to agree a permanent move. In June 2016, Elez was sent to HNK Rijeka in Croatia on a season-long loan, with a buying option for €450,000. It was revealed in early May 2017 that HNK Rijeka exercised the buying option.

On 1 July 2017, Elez signed a three-year contract with HNK Rijeka, effectively tying him with the club until June 2020.

In January 2018, Elez was transferred to Hannover 96 on loan for the rest of the season. Hannover 96 was also given a buying option part of a transfer that would involve €3 million transfer fee.

Elez rejoined Hajduk Split for the 2021–22 season on a four-year contract. He scored his first goal for Hajduk Split against his former club Rijeka

Career statistics

Honours
HNK Rijeka
 Croatian First Football League: 2016–17
 Croatian Football Cup: 2016–17

Hajduk Split
 Croatian Football Cup: 2021–22

References

External links
 
 

1994 births
Living people
Footballers from Split, Croatia
Association football defenders
Croatian footballers
Croatia under-21 international footballers
Croatia youth international footballers
Croatian expatriate footballers
HNK Hajduk Split players
S.S. Lazio players
F.C. Grosseto S.S.D. players
Budapest Honvéd FC players
Aarhus Gymnastikforening players
HNK Rijeka players
Hannover 96 players
Croatian Football League players
Nemzeti Bajnokság I players
Danish Superliga players
Bundesliga players
Expatriate footballers in Italy
Expatriate footballers in Hungary
Expatriate men's footballers in Denmark
Croatian expatriate sportspeople in Italy
Croatian expatriate sportspeople in Hungary
Croatian expatriate sportspeople in Denmark
Croatian expatriate sportspeople in Germany
Expatriate footballers in Germany